Donaghy's Rope & Twine Co Ltd v Wright Stephenson & Co (1906) 2 NZLR 641 is a cited case in New Zealand regarding the risk of goods under the Sale of Goods Act 1908.

References

Court of Appeal of New Zealand cases
New Zealand contract case law
1906 in New Zealand law
1906 in case law